Bermeo is a town and municipality in the comarca of Busturialdea. It is in the province of Biscay, which is part of the autonomous region of the Basque Country in northern Spain.

With a population of 16,765, it is the most important fishing port in the Basque Country. The town was founded in 1236, and is the largest in Busturialdea. Bermeo was the provincial capital of Biscay from 1476 to 1602.

Tourist attractions include the island of Gaztelugatxe, the Ercilla Tower (a fishing museum), San Juan Gate and the port. Bermeo is connected by Euskotren Trena and BizkaiBus to Bilbao. It has a number of neighbourhoods: Arana, Artike, Agirre, San Andres, Almike, Arronategi, San Migel, Demiku, Mañu and San Pelaio.

History 
Bermeo's history dates back to the monastery of San Juan of Gaztelugatxe in 1051. In 1082, it is mentioned by Don Lope lñiguez as "Sancti Michaelis Arcangeli in Portu of Vermelio". Ferdinand II of Aragon named the town the capital of Biscay on 31 July 1476, a position it held until 1602. Many documents have been destroyed by fire; notable fires occurred in 1297, 1347, 1360, 1422 and 1504. The founding of Bilbao in 1300 also coincided with decline in Bermeo.

Climate 
The town has an oceanic climate, with heavy rains in spring and late fall. The average annual minimum temperature is about 9 °C (48 °F), and the maximum is about 19 °C (66 °F). The record maximum temperature is 45 °C (113 °F), and the record minimum is -9 °C (16 °F).

Population 
As a result of increased immigration due to industrialisation during the 1960s, the population grew rapidly. Although it began to decline during the 1990s, the population has increased again since 2000.

Economy 

Bermeo's economy is based on fishing, and its port is the town's chief source of revenue. It has a fleet of deep-sea vessels, and Bermeo's coastal fisheries are among the region's most important. In addition to fishing, diesel engines and generators are manufactured and the commercial port receives raw materials. Bermeo also has connections with the timber and undersea-gas industries.

Transportation 
Bermeo is connected by road to Mungia ( away) by the BI-631 road and to Gernika-Lumo ( away) by the BI-2235. The capital, Bilbao ( away), is reached by the BI-631 and the BI-2235.

BizkaiBus connects Bermeo with Guernica, Amorebieta-Etxano, Bilbao, Derio and Bakio. Euskotren Trena connects the town directly with Bilbao, Guernica, Amorebieta-Etxano, Biscay and Gipuzkoa. Bermeo also has taxi and Bermibusa (urban bus) service.

Attractions 

On the road to Bakio is the lighthouse of Matxitxako, on the cape of the same name. Further along is Akatz Island, next to Gaztelugatxe (an island with the San Juan de Gaztelugatxe monastery). During the 14th century a castle topped the island, which was replaced by the monastery. On 29 August a mass celebrates the feast of San Juan. The island is a protected area.

Akatz Island, a small island next to Gaztelugatxe, has little vegetation but a significant nesting-bird population. On its cape is the Matxitxako lighthouse, which has good views of the coast and from which cetaceans may be seen. Izaro Island is part of the Urdaibai Reserve. 

Bermeo's old town has many houses painted in different colours and narrow streets with squares. Aritzatxu is a small beach.

Ercilla Tower is the only remaining tower of 30 towers which defended Bermeo during the Middle Ages. In the old port, it was built at the end of the 15th century and housed the Ercilla family (including Alonso de Ercilla y Zúñiga, author of The Araucana). In addition to its military use, it housed fishermen and warehoused fish. It was renovated in 1948 with Gothic arches as the Fisherman's Museum; additional renovation was done in 1984 and 1985.

Bermeo's town hall, in Sabino Arana Goiri Square, was built in 1732. With two clocks on its facade, it is one of the town's Artistic Historical Monuments.

The Kikunbera house, in Basque Rationalist style, was designed to resemble a ship and has been an Artistic Historical Monument since 1995. Batzoki is a modernist building by Pedro Ispizua.

Gallery

References

External links
 BERMEO in the Bernardo Estornés Lasa - Auñamendi Encyclopedia (Euskomedia Fundazioa) 
 Town council 
 Tourist information 
Fishermen Museum 
San Juan de Gaztelugatxe  

Fishing communities
Municipalities in Biscay
1236 establishments in Europe
Populated places established in the 1230s
Populated coastal places in Spain